The 2008–09 QMJHL season was the 40th season of the Quebec Major Junior Hockey League (QMJHL). The regular season began on September 11, 2008, and ended on March 15, 2009. The 2008 ADT Canada Russia Challenge series, featuring Team QMJHL versus the Russian Selects, took place on November 17 and 19, 2008. Eighteen teams played 68 games each. The Drummondville Voltigeurs, who finished first overall in the regular season, went on to capture their first President's Cup vs. the Shawinigan Cataractes in a series they won 4–3.

Team Changes
 The St. John's Fog Devils relocated to Verdun, Quebec, and are rename the Montreal Junior Hockey Club, and move from the Atlantic Division to the Telus West.
 The league switch from 2 division to 4. All 5 Maritime teams play in the Atlantic Division and all Quebec teams and the Lewiston Maineiacs are split into 3 Divisions Telus East, Telus Central, Telus West.

Notable dates
 Offseason
 June 20–21, 2008—27 QMJHL players were selected in the 2008 NHL Entry Draft.

 Regular season
 November 17, 2008–Team QMJHL defeats the Russian Selects 5–3 in Game 1 of the ADT Canada-Russia Challenge held in Sydney, Nova Scotia.
 November 19, 2008–Team QMJHL defeated by Russian Selects 4–3 in Game 2 of the ADT Canada-Russia Challenge held in Saint John, New Brunswick
 Playoffs

Standings

Division Standings

Overall Standing
 determines standings for the second round of the playoffs.

x - team clinched QMJHL Playoff spot

z - team has clinched division

Scoring leaders
Note: GP = Games played; G = Goals; A = Assists; Pts = Points; PIM = Penalty minutes

Leading goaltenders
Note: GP = Games played; Min = Minutes played; W = Wins; L = Losses; SOL = Shootout losses ; GA = Goals against; SO = Total shutouts; SV% = Save percentage; GAA = Goals against average

Players

2008 QMJHL Entry Draft
First round
 	Moncton Wildcats 	 Brandon Gormley (D) 	 					
 	Drummondville Voltigeurs 	 Sean Couturier (C) 
	Victoriaville Tigres 	 Brandon Hynes (RW) 	 					
 	Val-d'Or Foreurs 	 Cedrick Henley (LW) 	 					
 	Prince Edward Island Rocket 	 Ben Duffy (F) 	 					
 	Lewiston MAINEiacs 	 Garrett Clarke (D) 	 					
 	Shawinigan Cataractes 	 Michaël Bournival (C/LW) 	 					
 	Montréal Juniors 	 Guillaume Asselin (RW) 	 					
 	Lewiston MAINEiacs 	 Michael Chaput (C) 	 					
 	Québec Remparts 	 Samuel Carrier (D) 	 					
	Acadie-Bathurst Titan 	 Vincent Arseneau (LW) 	 					
 	Cape Breton Screaming Eagles 	 Logan Shaw (RW) 	 					
 	Moncton Wildcats 	 Louis Domingue (G) 	 					
 	Lewiston MAINEiacs 	 Etienne Brodeur (LW) 	 					
 	Val-d'Or Foreurs 	 Alex Noël (RW) 	 					
 	Gatineau Olympiques 	 Yoan Pinette (RW) 	 					
	Acadie-Bathurst Titan 	 Stefan Fournier (RW) 	 					
 	Drummondville Voltigeurs 	 Jerome Gauthier-Leduc (D)

2008 NHL Entry Draft
In total, 27 QMJHL players were selected at the 2008 NHL Entry Draft.

Trades

Off-season

QMJHL Playoffs

Overview

First round

Division Telus Centre

Division Telus Est

Division Atlantique

Division Telus Ouest

Quarter-finals

Semi-finals

QMJHL Championship

Canada Russia Challenge
The ADT Canada Russia Challenge is a six-game series featuring four teams: three from the Canadian Hockey League (CHL) versus Russia's National Junior hockey team. Within the Canadian Hockey League umbrella, one team from each of its three leagues — the Ontario Hockey League, Quebec Major Junior Hockey League, and Western Hockey League — compete in two games against the Russian junior team.

The 2008 ADT Canada Russia Challenge was held in six cities across Canada, with two cities for each league within the Canadian Hockey League. The series began on November 17, 2008, and concluded on November 27, 2008. All six games were televised nationally on Rogers Sportsnet, along with RDS televising both games from the Quebec Major Junior Hockey League.

 Results
In the first game of the two part series between Team QMJHL and the Russian Selects, Team QMJHL scored five goals en route to a 5–3 win in front of 4,378 fans at Centre 200 in Sydney, Nova Scotia. Kmitri Kugryshev of the Russian Selects and goaltender Olivier Roy of Team QMJHL were named the ADT Players of the Game for their respective teams. The Russian Selects evened the ADT Canada Russia Challenge, winning the second game after having registered four goals in a 4–3 victory in front of a sellout crowd of 6,451 assembled at Harbour Station in Saint John, New Brunswick.

Memorial Cup

The 91st MasterCard Memorial Cup was held in Rimouski, Quebec.

All-star teams
First team
 Goaltender - Nicola Riopel, Moncton Wildcats
 Defence - Dmitri Kulikov, Drummondville Voltigeurs & Marc-André Bourdon, Rimouski Océanic
 Left winger - Mike Hoffman, Drummondville Voltigeurs
 Centreman - Cedric Lalonde-McNicoll, Shawinigan Cataractes
 Right winger - Yannick Riendeau, Drummondville Voltigeurs

Second team
 Goaltender - Charles Lavigne, Quebec Remparts
 Defence - Charles-Olivier Roussel, Shawinigan Cataractes & Sébastien Piché, Rimouski Océanic
 Left winger - Paul Byron, Gatineau Olympiques
 Centreman - Danny Masse, Drummondville Voltigeurs
 Right winger - Nicholas Petersen, Shawinigan Cataractes

Rookie team
 Goaltender - Christopher Holden, Cape Breton Screaming Eagles
 Defence - Dmitri Kulikov, Drummondville Voltigeurs & Brandon Gormley, Moncton Wildcats
 Left winger - Sergey Ostapchuk, Rouyn-Noranda Huskies
 Centreman - Ben Duffy, P.E.I. Rocket
 Right winger - Dmitri Kugryshev, Quebec Remparts

Trophies and awards
Team
President's Cup - Playoff Champions: Drummondville Voltigeurs
Jean Rougeau Trophy - Regular Season Champions: Drummondville Voltigeurs
Luc Robitaille Trophy - Team that scored the most goals: Drummondville Voltigeurs
Robert Lebel Trophy - Team with best GAA: Moncton Wildcats

Player
Michel Brière Memorial Trophy - Most Valuable Player: Nicola Riopel, Moncton Wildcats
Jean Béliveau Trophy - Top Scorer: Yannick Riendeau, Drummondville Voltigeurs
Guy Lafleur Trophy - Playoff MVP : Yannick Riendeau, Drummondville Voltigeurs
Jacques Plante Memorial Trophy - Best GAA: Nicola Riopel, Moncton Wildcats
Guy Carbonneau Trophy - Best Defensive Forward: Jean-Philip Chabot, Gatineau Olympiques
Emile Bouchard Trophy - Defenceman of the Year: Dmitri Kulikov, Drummondville Voltigeurs
Kevin Lowe Trophy - Best Defensive Defenceman: Maxime Ouimet, Rimouski Oceanic
Mike Bossy Trophy - Best Pro Prospect: Dmitri Kulikov, Drummondville Voltigeurs
RDS Cup - Rookie of the Year: Dmitri Kulikov, Drummondville Voltigeurs
Michel Bergeron Trophy - Offensive Rookie of the Year: Dmitri Kugryshev, Quebec Remparts
Raymond Lagacé Trophy - Defensive Rookie of the Year: Dmitri Kulikov, Drummondville Voltigeurs
Frank J. Selke Memorial Trophy - Most sportsmanlike player: Cedric Lalonde-McNicoll, Shawinigan Cataractes
QMJHL Humanitarian of the Year - Humanitarian of the Year: Matthew Pistilli, Shawinigan Cataractes
Marcel Robert Trophy - Best Scholastic Player: Payton Liske, Saint John Sea Dogs
Paul Dumont Trophy - Personality of the Year: Guy Boucher, Drummondville Voltigeurs

Executive
Ron Lapointe Trophy - Coach of the Year: Danny Flynn, Moncton Wildcats
Maurice Filion Trophy - General Manager of the Year: Dominic Ricard, Drummondville Voltigeurs
John Horman Trophy - Executive of the Year: Louis Painchaud, Quebec Remparts
Jean Sawyer Trophy - Marketing Director of the Year: Sylvie Fortier, Drummondville Voltigeurs

See also
 2009 Memorial Cup
 List of QMJHL seasons
 2008–09 OHL season
 2008–09 WHL season
 2008 NHL Entry Draft
 2008 in ice hockey
 2009 in ice hockey

References

External links
 Official QMJHL website
 Official CHL website
 Official website of the MasterCard Memorial Cup
 Official website of the Home Hardware Top Prospects Game
 Official website of the ADT Canada Russia Challenge

Quebec Major Junior Hockey League seasons
QMJHL